Marie Marguerite Françoise Hébert, née Marie Goupil (1756, Paris – 13 April 1794, Paris), was a figure in the French Revolution who died by guillotine during the Reign of Terror.

Biography
Marie Goupil was born in Paris to Jacques Goupil, a lingerie merchant who died prematurely, and Louise Morel (who died in 1781).

She became a nun in the convent of the Conception (on rue Saint-Honoré) in Paris as a "sister of Providence"  on the rue Saint-Honoré, but she left the convent after the suppression of monastic vows. Choosing to pursue new ideas, she became a member of the Fraternal Society of Both Sexes, which was an early example of active participation of women in politics. At one of the group's meetings she met the prominent revolutionary Jacques René Hébert and they married on 7 February 1792.

The couple had a daughter Scipion-Virginie Hébert (7 February 1793 – 13 July 1830), but the infant was orphaned when her father was guillotined on 24 March 1794, and her mother Marie was guillotined on 13 April 1794, only twenty days later along with Lucile Desmoulins, Chaumette and Gobel, and others. The bodies of Marie Hébert, as well as the others guillotined that day, were disposed of in Errancis Cemetery.

Scipion-Virginie Hébert was raised by a printer, Jacques Christophe Marquet. She became undermistress of a boarding school and married a Reformed pastor and had six children. She died at 37 years of age.

References

  

1756 births
1794 deaths
Nuns from Paris
French nuns executed by guillotine during the French Revolution
18th-century French nuns
18th-century Christian nuns